Daughter (Czech: Dcera) is a 2019 Czech short animated drama film directed by Daria Kashcheeva. The film received 38 awards during half a year after its premiere at the Annecy International Animation Film Festival, including the Annecy Cristal for the best film in the graduation films category, and a Student Academy Award (Student Oscar). It was also nominated for the Academy Award for Best Animated Short Film.

Plot 

The film is told without words. It is about the complicated relationship of a young woman with her father. She meets with him in a hospital room where she remembers her childhood and complicated relationship with her father and how they parted ways until they meet again and finally reconcile.

Background 

Daughter is the product of the director's longtime interest in psychology, relationships, and the lasting imprint of childhood experiences. The film tells a complicated story about the relationship between a father and his daughter. Kashcheeva invented hand held camera movement for her film, which was never used before in stop-motion.

Style
For Kashcheeva, part of the challenge of creating Daughter stemmed from her desire to bring a dirty, imperfect, documentary feel to a stop-motion world. The aesthetic she aimed for was inspired, in part, by Dogme 95 and films by the Dardenne brothers.

Awards

See also
2019 in film
List of Czech animated films

References

External links 

 
 Daughter at CSFD.cz 
 MUBI

2019 animated films
2019 films
Animated films without speech
Czech animated films
Czech drama films
Czech Lion Awards winners (films)
Films about father–daughter relationships
Films about memory
Stop-motion animated short films
Czech animated drama films